The 2012 FedEx 400 was a NASCAR Sprint Cup Series stock car race held on June 3, 2012 at Dover International Speedway in Dover, Delaware. Contested over 400 laps, it was the thirteenth race of the 2012 season. Jimmie Johnson of Hendrick Motorsports took his second win of the season, while Kevin Harvick finished second and Matt Kenseth finished third.

There were seven cautions and seventeen lead changes among seven different drivers during the race. Johnson's win maintained his fifth-place position in the drivers' championship, 33 points behind leader Greg Biffle and twelve ahead of Martin Truex Jr. in sixth. Chevrolet led the Manufacturer Championship with 90 points, sixteen ahead of Toyota and 23 ahead of Ford in third.

Report

Background

Dover International Speedway is one of five short tracks to hold NASCAR races; the others are Bristol Motor Speedway, Richmond International Raceway, Martinsville Speedway, and Phoenix International Raceway. The track's turns are banked at twenty-four degrees. The front stretch, the location of the finish line, is banked at nine degrees with the backstretch. The racetrack has seats for 135,000 spectators.

Before the race, Greg Biffle led the Drivers' Championship with 453 points, and Matt Kenseth stood in second with 443. Denny Hamlin was third in the Drivers' Championship with 437, two points ahead of Dale Earnhardt Jr. and twenty-two ahead of Jimmie Johnson in fourth and fifth. Martin Truex Jr. with 404 was six points ahead of Kevin Harvick, as Kyle Busch with 391 points, was three ahead of Tony Stewart and nineteen in front of Carl Edwards. In the Manufacturers' Championship, Chevrolet was leading with 81 points, eleven points ahead of Toyota. Ford, with 61 points, was nine points ahead of Dodge in the battle for third. Kenseth was the race's defending champion.

Practice and qualifying

Two practice sessions were held before the race on June 1, 2012. The first session was 85 minutes long, while the second lasted 90 minutes. Mark Martin was quickest with a time of 22.613 seconds in the first session, 0.039 faster than Hamlin. Truex Jr. was third quickest, followed by Biffle, Kyle Busch, and Biffle. Ryan Newman was seventh, still within two-tenths of a second of Martin's time. In the second and final practice, Aric Almirola was quickest with a time of 22.900 seconds. Jeff Gordon followed in second, ahead of Earnhardt Jr. and Johnson.Scott Speed was fifth quickest, with a time of 23.260 seconds. Jamie McMurray, Michael McDowell, Kurt Busch, Joe Nemechek, and J. J. Yeley rounded out the first ten positions. Martin, who was quickest in the first session, could only manage 29th.

Forty-five cars were entered for qualifying on June 2, 2012, but only forty-three could qualify for the race because of NASCAR's qualifying procedure. Martin of Michael Waltrip Racing clinched the 54th pole position of his Sprint Cup Series career, with a time of 22.742 seconds. He was joined on the front row of the grid by Johnson. Newman qualified third, Clint Bowyer took fourth, and Kenseth started fifth. Harvick, Kyle Busch, Biffle, Kurt Busch and Hamlin rounded out the top ten. The two drivers who failed to qualify for the race were Josh Wise and Cole Whitt.

Once the qualifying session was completed, Martin stated, "I'll never do that again. I anticipated the car being loose, but I didn't ask Rodney if he tightened it up. I knew the conditions were looser than they were in our mock qualifying run, and I didn't want to ask him because I didn't want to be concerned. I knew that I only had to make it one mile without wrecking, and I was going to drive to the limit and slightly beyond, and I felt like I did that. I wouldn't want to do that again. But I couldn't sit on these poles without the fastest race car, and MWR and Rodney Childers in particular and the guys on our team are doing that."

Race

The race, the thirteenth in the season, began at 1:00 p.m. EDT and was televised live in the United States on Fox. Dan Schafer, pastor of Calvary Assembly of God in Hightstown, New Jersey, began pre-race ceremonies, by giving the invocation. Next, Kris Allen performed the national anthem, and Delaware Governor Jack Markell gave the command for drivers to start their engines.

Martin retained his pole position lead into the first corner, followed by Johnson, who started second. However, by the end of the first lap, Johnson had become the leader. On the following lap, Bowyer fell to fifth, as Kenseth passed him. On the seventh lap, Martin reclaimed the lead from Johnson. Two laps later, the race was slowed by a caution flag after a large accident involving thirteen drivers occurred on the backstretch, including Tony Stewart, Landon Cassill, Juan Pablo Montoya, Scott Speed, Joe Nemechek, and more. The race was red flagged shortly after the accident. After twenty minutes under the red flag, the race resumed under caution. Most of the front running drivers didn't make a pit stop during the caution, while others who were behind seventeenth pitted. On the lap 13 restart, Martin was the leader ahead of Johnson, as Kenseth passed Newman for the third position. By the eighteenth lap, Martin had expanded his lead to half a second over Johnson. However, Johnson began to catch Martin, and passed him for the first position on lap 30.

On lap 35, Johnson continued to lead over Martin and Kenseth, while Bowyer was placed in fourth. Johnson continued to expand his lead over Martin to over a second by the 43rd lap in the race. Less than ten laps later, Johnson passed Kurt Busch, who started ninth, to place him a lap behind the leaders. On the 56th lap, Gordon overtook Kyle Busch for the fifth position, as Newman fell to tenth after Hamlin and Edwards passed him. Thirteen laps later, David Stremme retired from the race as green flag pit stops began after McMurray, Biffle, Hamlin and Harvick came to pit road. Kenseth and ten other drivers pitted on the following lap, as Martin, Johnson, Bowyer, Earnhardt Jr., and Gordon pitted on the 71st lap. Two laps later, Stewart, who was involved in the accident during the ninth lap, returned to the race after repairs to the car. At lap 75, Kurt Busch was given a drive-through penalty after entering pit road too fast, as Martin reclaimed the lead.

Nine laps later, Johnson moved past Martin to take the first position. By the 91st lap, Johnson expanded his lead to one second over Martin. Six laps later, Kenseth moved to the third position while Gordon moved to fourth. On lap 98, Regan Smith returned to the race after repairs to the damage sustained on the ninth lap to his car. Less than five laps later, Stephen Leicht and Reed Sorenson also returned to the race to gain positions and points (Sorenson's team trying to gain breathing room inside the Top 35, while Leicht was trying to get closer), while Johnson maintained a two-second lead over Martin. On the 109th lap, Juan Pablo Montoya returned to the race after sustaining damage to his car after the accident on lap nine. Three laps later, the second caution was given after David Reutimann's engine failed. On the lap 117 restart, Johnson led ahead of Martin, Kenseth, Kyle Busch, and Gordon. On the following lap, Kyle Busch passed Martin for the second position, as Johnson expanded his lead. By lap 132, Harvick had moved into the third position while Martin fell to the fifth position.

On lap 133, Leicht returned to the garage after being over 100 laps off the pace, and Gordon passed Harvick for the third position. Eight laps later, Gordon overtook Kyle Busch to claim the second position behind Johnson. On the 160th lap, Harvick reclaimed the third position from Kyle Busch.

Results

Qualifying

Race results

Standings after the race

Drivers' Championship standings

Manufacturers' Championship standings

Note: Only the top five positions are included for the driver standings.

References

NASCAR races at Dover Motor Speedway
FedEx 400
FedEx 400
FedEx 400